Hakafashist ('Anti-Fascist') was an Armenian language newspaper published in Iranian Azerbaijan 1943-1945. Hakafashist was an organ of the Anti-Fascist Committee of Azerbaijan. In 1945 it changed name of Arulik (արևելք, 'East').

References

1943 establishments in Iran
1945 disestablishments in Iran
Armenian-language newspapers
Newspapers established in 1943
Publications disestablished in 1945
Defunct newspapers published in Iran